University of Tsukuba Virtual Private Network, UT-VPN is a free and open source software application that implements virtual private network (VPN) techniques for creating secure point-to-point or site-to-site connections in routed or bridged configurations and remote access facilities. It uses SSL/TLS security for encryption and is capable of traversing network address translators (NATs) and firewalls. It was written by Daiyuu Nobori and SoftEther Corporation, and is published under the GNU General Public License (GPL) by University of Tsukuba.

UT-VPN has compatible as PacketiX VPN product of SoftEther Corporation. UT-VPN developed based on PacketiX VPN, but some functions was deleted. For example, the RADIUS client is supported by PacketiX VPN Server, but it is not supported by UT-VPN Server.

Architecture

Encryption
UT-VPN uses the OpenSSL library to provide encryption to packets.

Authentication
UT-VPN offers username/password-based authentication.

Networking
UT-VPN is software to consist of UT-VPN Server and UT-VPN Client. UT-VPN functions as L2-VPN (over SSL/TLS).

UT-VPN Client
'Virtual NIC' (virtual network interface card) is installed in OS how UT-VPN Client was installed in. Virtual NIC is recognized as physical NIC by OS. UT-VPN does encapsulation to TCP (or SSL/TLS) packets from L2 frames by Virtual NIC.

UT-VPN Client connects with UT-VPN Server. If authorization with UT-VPN Server succeeded, UT-VPN Client establishes connection with Virtual HUB.

UT-VPN Server
UT-VPN Server have some 'Virtual HUB', and they function as virtual L2 switch. Virtual HUB does handle frames which received from UT-VPN Client. If necessary, UT-VPN Server forwards encapsulated L2 frames to UT-VPN Client.
Virtual HUB on UT-VPN Server has function cascading connection for Virtual HUB on other UT-VPN Server. Site-to-site connection can come true with cascading connection.

L2 Bridge
UT-VPN Server has bridging function between arbitrary NIC which OS has and virtual HUB.

L3 Switch
UT-VPN Server has Virtual L3 switch function. Virtual L3 switch does L3-switching between virtual HUB on the UT-VPN Server.

Operational Environment

UT-VPN Server
 Windows
 Windows 98 / Millennium Edition
 Windows NT 4.0
 Windows 2000
 Windows XP
 Windows Server 2003
 Windows Vista
 Windows Server 2008
 Hyper-V Server
 Windows 7
 Windows Server 2008 R2
 * Supported for x86/x64

 UNIX
 Linux (2.4 or later)
 FreeBSD (6.0 or later)
 Solaris (8.0 or later)
 Mac OS X (Tiger or later)
 * If it is the environment where compiling it is possible of the source code, UT-VPN Server works.

UT-VPN Client
 Windows
 Windows 98
 Windows ME
 Windows 2000
 Windows XP
 Windows Server 2003
 Windows Vista
 Windows Server 2008
 Hyper-V Server
 Windows 7
 Windows Server 2008 R2
 *Supported for x86/x64

 UNIX
 Linux (2.4 or later)
 * The Virtual NIC does not work in other UNIX operating systems.

Community
The primary method for community support is through the SoftEther mailing lists.

See also

 University of Tsukuba
 SoftEther Corporation
 OpenVPN, The well-known open source VPN software.

References

External links
Official links
 UT-VPN OpenSource Project (Japanese)
 UT-VPN Download (Japanese, require email address)

Computer network security
Tunneling protocols
Free security software
Unix network-related software